The First Hodgman Ministry was the Cabinet of Tasmania from 31 March 2014 to 21 March 2018. It was created after the defeat of the Giddings Ministry at the 2014 Tasmanian state election, and was replaced by the Second Hodgman Ministry after the 2018 Tasmanian state election.

First formation

Second formation
Hodgman reshuffled his ministry on 18 February 2016, after Paul Harriss resigned from the cabinet and the parliament. Adam Brooks joined the cabinet, taking over Harriss's Resources portfolio (renamed as Minister for Mining), as well as the new portfolios of Consumer Affairs and Red Tape Reduction and Building and Construction, and the Racing portfolio previously held by Jeremy Rockliff. Treasurer Peter Gutwein was also appointed Minister for Forestry in addition to his other ministerial roles.

Third formation
On 9 June 2016, less than four months after his appointment to cabinet, Adam Brooks (Minister for Mining, Racing, and Building and Construction) was suspended from Cabinet after misleading a budget estimates committee over his use of a company email account belonging to a mining consultancy he owned. On 13 June, Brooks resigned from Cabinet. His former portfolios were assigned to Jeremy Rockliff (Racing), Peter Gutwein (Building and Construction) and Rene Hidding (Mining) on a provisionary basis, before a reshuffle on 18 July that coincided with the appointment of Guy Barnett.

Fourth formation
On 28 September 2017, Hodgman announced a reshuffle due to the resignation of Vanessa Goodwin from the cabinet and the Legislative Council, and Matthew Groom moving to the backbench. Elise Archer resigned as Speaker of the House of Assembly and was appointed to the cabinet.

References

External links
The Ministry, Parliament of Tasmania

Tasmanian ministries